Anthony Eugene Campbell (born June 14, 1960) is an American former hurdler. He is the 1988 Olympic bronze medallist in the 110m Hurdles, the 1987 World Indoor champion in the 60m hurdles, and won the 1985 World Cup title in the 110m hurdles. A three-time winner of the 110 metres hurdles at the IAAF Grand Prix Final, he also won the 1987 Overall Grand Prix title, with fellow hurdler Greg Foster second and pole vaulter Sergey Bubka third.

Career
Born in Los Angeles, California, Campbell attended the University of Southern California.   He was the 1982 NCAA Indoor Champion for 60 yard hurdles.  While a sophomore at USC, he qualified for the 1980 U.S. Olympic team, but was prevented from competing in the 1980 Summer Olympics by the American-led boycott.  Campbell was the youngest member of a movement that considered circumventing the U.S. boycott by competing under the International Olympic Committee flag, in an effort to make a statement that politics and sports should not be mixed. However, threats by U.S. officials to revoke athletes' passports and visas caused the effort to fold.  Campbell noted that he would have moved forward with the effort if the group had decided to move forward: "For my age and who I was at the time, that would have been the right thing for me to do.  In the event that we were banned from coming back to the U.S., I think I would have survived. I've been around the world enough to see some incredibly wonderful places where I could have been very comfortable."

Campbell qualified and participated in the 1984 Summer Olympics in Los Angeles, California, taking 5th in the 110m Hurdles; and again in for the 1988 Seoul Games, where he won the bronze medal.

Campbell was one of the most consistent high hurdlers of the 80s. In Track and Field News magazine's world merit rankings, he was ranked in the top ten for eleven consecutive years (1980–90) with his highest placement being number two (in 1987). He married the English hurdler Michelle Edwards. Their daughter Taylor Campbell lives in England and has also competed as a hurdler.

He coached former American footballer David Wilson in the triple jump prior to the 2016 US Olympic Trials.

International competitions

References
 

1960 births
Living people
American male hurdlers
Olympic bronze medalists for the United States in track and field
USC Trojans men's track and field athletes
Athletes (track and field) at the 1984 Summer Olympics
Athletes (track and field) at the 1988 Summer Olympics
Track and field athletes from Los Angeles
Athletes (track and field) at the 1983 Pan American Games
Pan American Games bronze medalists for the United States
Pan American Games medalists in athletics (track and field)
Medalists at the 1988 Summer Olympics
World Athletics Indoor Championships winners
Competitors at the 1990 Goodwill Games
Medalists at the 1983 Pan American Games